Bronis Ropė (born 14 April 1955) is a Lithuanian member of the European Parliament representing the Lithuanian Farmers and Greens Union (Greens–European Free Alliance). He was first elected in 2014 and was re-elected in 2019.

Biography
He studied at the Kaunas University of Technology between 1974-1979  where he was elected chairman of the faculty trade union from 1976 to 1978. He was the mayor of Ignalina from 1995 to 2014. He is also the first vice chairman of the Lithuanian Farmers and Greens Union. He married his wife Danutė Šileikytė-Ropienė in 1985 and they have two sons.

References

External links
 Home | Bronis ROPĖ | MEPs | European Parliament

Kaunas University of Technology alumni
Living people
MEPs for Lithuania 2019–2024
1955 births
20th-century Lithuanian politicians
Mayors of places in Lithuania
MEPs for Lithuania 2014–2019
Lithuanian Farmers and Greens Union MEPs